Amin Mahmoud may refer to:

 Amin El Hady (born 1983), Egyptian judoka
 Amin Mahmoud (politician) (born 1940), Jordanian politician, educator and author